is the tenth single release by Japanese music trio Candies. Written by Yūsuke Hoguchi, the single was released on May 31, 1976. It was Hoguchi's last single written for the trio.

The song peaked at No. 5 on Oricon's singles chart and sold over 176,000 copies.

Track listing

Chart positions

References

External links 
 

1976 singles
1976 songs
Japanese-language songs
Candies (group) songs
Sony Music Entertainment Japan singles